Bluebird of Happiness may refer to:

"Bluebird of Happiness" (song), Jan Peerce (1934)
Bluebird of Happiness (album), Tamar Braxton (2017)
Bluebird of happiness, in folklore